Sir Khawaja Nazimuddin (19 July 1894 – 22 October 1964) was a Pakistani politician and one of the leading founding fathers of Pakistan. He is noted as being the first Bengali to have governed Pakistan, first as a Governor-General (1948–51), and later as a Prime Minister (1951–53).

Born into an aristocratic Nawab family in Bengal in 1894, he was educated at the Aligarh Muslim University before pursuing his post-graduation studies at the Cambridge University. Upon returning, he embarked on his journey as a politician on the platform of All-India Muslim League. Initially, his political career revolved around advocating for educational reforms and development in Bengal. Later on he started supporting the cause for a separate Muslim homeland, rising to become the party's principal Bengali leader and a close associate of Muhammad Ali Jinnah. He served as Prime Minister of Bengal in British India from 1943 to 1945, and later as the 1st Chief Minister of East Bengal in independent Pakistan. 

Nazimuddin ascended to Governor-General in 1948 after the death of Jinnah, before becoming Prime Minister in 1951 following the assassination of his predecessor, Liaquat Ali Khan. His term was marked by constant power struggles with his own successor as Governor-General, Ghulam Muhammad, as law and order deteriorated amid the rise of the Bengali language movement and protests in his native Dhaka in 1952, and religious riots in Lahore a year later. The latter crisis saw the first instance of martial law, limited to the city, and led to Ghulam Muhammad dismissing Nazimuddin on 17 April 1953. 

Nazimuddin's ministry was the first federal government to be dismissed in Pakistan's history, though his former ministers Sardar Abdur Rab Nishtar, Abdul Sattar Pirzada, and Mahmud Husain refused to take oath in the new cabinet. He retired from national politics, passing away after a brief illness in 1964. He is buried at the Mausoleum of Three Leaders in Dhaka.

Biography

Family background, early life and education 
He was born into a wealthy Bengali family of the Nawabs of Dhaka on 19 July 1894 then under British Raj rule. His father was Khwaja Nizamuddin and paternal grandfather was Khwaja Fakhruddin. His family hailed from Kashmir and was long settled in Dhaka. He was the maternal grandson of Nawab Bahadur Sir Khwaja Ahsanullah and his mother, Nawabzadi Bilqis Banu, was notable for her own statue. Nazimuddin had a younger brother, Khwaja Shahabuddin, who would later play a vital role in national politics onwards. His family spoke Persian, Urdu, and Bengali. They were the first cousin of Nawab Khwaja Habibullah son of Nawab Sir Khwaja Salimullah Bahadur who helped laid foundation of Muslim League in 1906.

He was educated at the Dunstable Grammar School in England, but returned to India following his matriculation where he enrolled to attend the MAO College of the Aligarh Muslim University (AMU) in Uttar Pradesh, India. Nazimuddin secured his graduation with a BA degree in sociology from AMU and returned to England to pursue higher education. During his time at AMU, he was known to be an avid tennis player and excelled in this sport when he represented his university in collegiate games.

After AMU, Nazimuddin went to England and attended Trinity Hall at Cambridge University. He was granted his MA degree in English by Cambridge University. His training in England enabled him to practice law and become a Barrister-at-Law in England.
He was knighted in 1934. In 1947–49, Nazimuddin was granted the degree of Doctor of Laws by the vice-chancellor of Dhaka University, Dr. Mahmud Hasan.

Politics

Public service and independence movement 

Nazimuddin returned to India to join his brother Khwaja Shahbuddin from England, taking interest in civil and public affairs that led him to join the Bengali politics. Both brother joined the Muslim League, and Nazimuddin successfully ran for the municipality election and elected as Chairman of Dhaka Municipality from 1922 until 1929. During this time, he was appointed as Education minister of Bengal. He remained minister of Education till 1934. Later he was appointed in Viceroy's Executive Council in 1934 which he served until 1937. In the former capacity he successfully piloted the Compulsory Primary Education Bill; removing disparity that existed in education between the Hindus and the Muslims. As Minister for Agriculture in 1935, he piloted the Agriculture Debtors Bill and the Bengal Rural Development Bill which freed poor Muslim cultivators from the clutches of Hindu moneylenders.

He participated in regional elections held in 1937 on a Muslim League's platform but conceded his defeat in favour of Fazlul Haq of Krishak Praja Part (KPP) who was appointed as Prime Minister of Bengal, while assuming his personal role as member of the legislative assembly.

In the India Office Records, Political and Secret Department Records (1756–1950), Category L/P&S, Record 5/250, 3/79, one comes across the Fortnightly Report (February 1947) to the Viceroy by the then Governor of Punjab Sir Evan Jenkins. According to this report when inquired about the Pakistan project, Khwaja Nazimuddin candidly told him that ″he did not know what Pakistan means and that nobody in the Muslim League knew.″ This remark clearly shows that so few as six months before the creation of Pakistan, even senior Muslim League leaders had no clarity as to the basic features of the State they were asking for.

Home and Prime Minister of Bengal and Chief Minister of East Bengal 

Upon the formation of the coalition government in an agreement facilitated between Muslim League  and the Krishak Praja Party, Nazimuddin was appointed as the home minister under Haq's premiership., which he continued until 1943.

Due to his conservative elite position, he became close associate of Muhammad Ali Jinnah, then-president of the Muslim League, who appointed him as a member of the executive committee to successfully promote Muslim League' party agenda and program that gained popularity in East Bengal. In 1940–41, Nazimuddin broke away from the coalition led by Premier Fazlul Haq and decided to become a leader of the opposition, leading campaign against Haq's premiership and primarily focused on Bengali nationalism issues.  In 1943, Nazimuddin took over the government from Premier Haq when the latter was dismissed by the Governor, John Herbert, amid controversies surrounding in his political campaigns. During this time, Nazimuddin played a crucial political role for the cause for the separate Muslim homeland, Pakistan. About his role, he was asked about the "Pakistan question" by British Governor Richard Casey in 1945 but he showed very little and no interests in discussing the existence of the movement and reportedly quoting: he did not know what Pakistan means and nobody in Muslim League knew."

His premiership lasted until 1945 when a motion of no confidence and faced with defeat in the assembly hall by 160 to 97 votes that effectively ended his premiership. He relinquished the office to Nausher Ali, an Indian nationalist Muslim and a prominent member of Congress Party who the speaker of the assembly, but the administration was taken over by Huseyn Shaheed Suhrawardy.

From 1945 to 1947, Nazimuddin continued to be served as the chairman of the Muslim League in Bengal, ardently supporting the political cause for Pakistan against the Congress Party. During this time, he had been in brief conflict with Premier Suhrawardy and strongly opposed the United Bengal Movement and led a strong parliamentary opposition in the assembly against Suhrawardy's administration in April 1947. The conflict between two men mainly existed because Suhrawardy had represented the middle class while Nazimuddin was representing the aristocracy in the assembly.

In 1947, he again contested in the party elections in the Muslim League against Suhrawardy's platform and securing his nomination as the party chairman for the Muslim League's East Bengal chapter. His success in the party election eventually led him to the appointed as the first Chief Minister of East Bengal after the Partition of India in 1947 and effectively gained controlled of the Muslim League in the province.

As the Chief Minister, he led the motion of confidence that ultimately voted in favour of joining the Federation of Pakistan and reorganized the Government of East Pakistan by delegating conservative members in his administration.

Governor-General of Pakistan (1948–51) 
On 14 August of 1947, Governor-General Muhammad Ali Jinnah relinquished the party presidency of the Pakistan Muslim League (PML) to Sir Khwaja Nazimuddin who took over the party of the President of Pakistan Muslim League (PML), due to his party electoral performance. On 1 November 1947, he was appointed as acting Governor-General in the absence of Governor-General Jinnah due to worsening health, and eventually appointed as Governor-General after passing of Muhammad Ali Jinnah, in a crucial support provided by Prime Minister Liaquat Ali Khan on 14 September 1948 to Nazimuddin. His oath of office was supervised by Chief Justice Sir Abdul Rashid of the Federal Court of Pakistan, in attendance with Prime Minister Liaquat Ali Khan.

As Governor-General, Nazimuddin set a precedent of neutrality and non-interference in the government, and provided his political support to Prime Minister Liaquat Ali Khan's government, which was seen as essential to the working of the responsible government at that time.

His role as Governor-General reflected a conservative mind-set and he spoke against secularism in the country.

In 1949, Governor-General Nazimuddin established the parliamentary committee, the Basic Principles Committee, on the advice of Prime Minister Ali Khan to underlying basic principles that would lay foundation of Constitution of Pakistan.

In 1950, Nazimuddin released an official policy statement and declared that: "Pakistan would remain incomplete until the whole of Kashmir is liberated."

Prime Ministership (1951–53) 

After the assassination of Liaqat Ali Khan in 1951, the Muslim League leaders asked Governor-General Nazimuddin to take over the business of the government as well as the party's presidency as there was no other person found suitable for the post. He appointed Finance Minister Sir Malik Ghulam to the  Governor-General's post. Nazimuddin's government focused towards promoting the political programs aimed towards conservative ideas. During his time in office, a framework was begun for a constitution that would allow Pakistan to become a republic, and end its British Dominion status under the Crown.

Nazimuddin's administration took place during a poor economy and the rise of provincial nationalism in four provinces and East Bengal which made him unable to run the country's affairs effectively. By 1951–52, the Muslim League had split into two different factions dominated by the Bengali chapter and Punjab-Sindh chapter, as those were the two largest ethnic demographics, but were separated by India.

In 1951, Prime Minister Nazimuddin's government conducted the country's first nationwide census where it was noted that 57% of the population of Karachi were refugees from India, which further complicated the situation in the country.
In January 1952, Prime Minister Nazimuddin publicly announced in Dacca's meeting that: Jinnah had been right: for the sake of Pakistan's national unity, Urdu must be the official language of Pakistan–East and West. On 21 February 1952, a demonstration in the Bengali Language movement demanding equal and official status to the Bengali language turned bloody, with many fatalities caused by police firings. This demonstration was held when he declared Urdu the National Language of Pakistan, following the previous statement of Muhammad Ali Jinnah that Urdu shall be 'one and only' language of Pakistan.

In 1953, a violent religious movement led by far-right Jamaat-e-Islami began to agitate for the removal of the Ahmadi religious minority from power positions, and demanded a declaration of this minority as non-Muslims.

Nazimuddin was held morally responsible for riots being spread and resisted such pressures; but mass rioting broke out in Punjab against both the government and followers of this religious minority. Prime Minister Nazimuddin responded to the violence by dismissing the Chief Minister of Punjab, Mumtaz Daultana, to Feroze Khan, but the decision came late. He declared martial law, with approval coming from Governor-General Malik Ghulam,  and enforced through Lieutenant General Azam Khan who successfully quelled the agitation.

Dismissal 
The agitations and violence spread through the successful Bengali language movement and the riots in Lahore proved the inability of Nazimuddin's government as he was widely seen as weak in running the government administration.

In a view of attempting to improve the economy and internal security, Malik Ghulam asked Prime Minister Nazimuddin to step down in the wider interest of the country. Nazimuddin refused to oblige and Malik Ghulam used reserve powers granted in the Government of India Act 1935, dismissed Nazimuddin.

Nazimuddin then requested the Federal Court of Pakistan's intervention against this action but the Chief Justice, Muh'd Munir did not rule on the legality of the dismissal, but instead forced new elections to be held in 1954. Malik Ghulam appointed another Bengali politician, Muhammad Ali Bogra who was then tenuring as the Pakistan ambassador to the United States, as the new prime minister until the new elections to be held in 1954. The dismissal of Sir Khwaja Nazimuddin's administration, the prime minister, by the Governor-General, Sir Malik Ghulam, signalled a troubling trend in political history of the country.

Death and legacy

Later life and death 

Even after his dismissal, he and his family remained active in parliamentary politics; his nephew, Khwaja Wasiuddin, an army general serving as GOC-in-C II Corps and later repatriated to Bangladesh in 1974.

His younger brother, Shahabuddin, remained active in the politics and eventually ascended as Information minister in the President Ayub Khan's administration.

Sir Khwaja died in 1964, aged 70. He was buried in the Mausoleum of three leaders in his hometown of Dhaka.

Wealth and honours 

Nazimuddin and his brother, Shahabuddin, belonged to an aristocratic family who were known for their wealth. In thesis written by Joya Chatterji, Nazimuddin was described for unquestionable loyalty to British administration in India:

By 1934, the family had estates that covered almost 200,000 acres and was well spread over different districts of Eastern Bengal, together with properties in Shillong, Assam and Kolkata, had a yearly rent of £120,000 ($2,736,497.94 in 2017). By the 1960s, the majority of estate was relocated from East Pakistan to the different areas of Pakistan, leaving very little of his estate in East.

He was appointed a Companion of the Order of the Indian Empire (CIE) in 1926, and was knighted in 1934 by the King-Emperor, George V, when he was appointed a Knight Commander of the Order of the Indian Empire (KCIE).

In 1958 he was awarded the highest civilian award titled Nishan-e-Pakistan. Later by the Government of Pakistan, Nazimuddin has been honoured from time to time after his death. In Karachi, the residential areas, Nazimabad and North Nazimabad in suburbs of Karachi, had been named after his name. In Islamabad, there is a road intersection, Nazimuddin Road, that has been named in his honor; while in Dhaka, there is also a road after his namesake.

In his honour, the Pakistan Post issued a commemorative stamp in accordance to his respect in 1990.

See also 

 List of prime ministers of Pakistan
 Politics of Pakistan
 Nawab of Dhaka

Notes

References 

 Current Events Biography, 1949

External links 

 Chronicles Of Pakistan
 Story of Pakistan

|-

|-

|-

|-

1894 births
1964 deaths
20th-century Bengalis
Nawabs of Dhaka
People educated at Dunstable Grammar School
Aligarh Muslim University alumni
Alumni of Trinity Hall, Cambridge
Politicians from Kolkata
Pakistan Movement activists from Bengal
Leaders of the Pakistan Movement
Knights Commander of the Order of the Indian Empire
Indian knights
People of East Pakistan
Governors-General of Pakistan
Pakistani barristers
Pakistani people of Bengali descent
Pakistani people of Kashmiri descent
Pakistan Muslim League politicians
Prime Ministers of Pakistan
Pakistani MNAs 1947–1954
Pakistani Muslims
Members of the Pakistan Philosophical Congress
Chief Ministers of East Pakistan
20th-century Indian lawyers
Bengal MLAs 1937–1945
Members of the Constituent Assembly of Pakistan